Confetti candy is a confectionery food product that is prepared with cooked sugar and corn syrup that is formed into sheets, cooled, and then cracked or broken into pieces. It has a hard, brittle texture. To add eye appeal, colored sugar is sometimes sprinkled atop after the cooking and shaping process has been performed.

Confetti candy, also known as confetti sprinkles is also a confectionery that consists of flat or disc-shaped candy sprinkles These are similar to round nonpareils, but are prepared in disc form. It is often used to decorate confectioneries and other sweets.

See also

 List of candies
 Suikerboon - Dutch variation on confetti
 Peanut brittle
 Muisjes
 Sno-Caps

References

Confectionery
Food and drink decorations